Bena Tsemay is one of the woredas in the Southern Nations, Nationalities, and Peoples' Region of Ethiopia. It is named after Banna and Tsamai people who are living at this woreda. Part of the Debub Omo Zone, Bena Tsemay is bordered on the south by Hamer, on the west by Selamago, on the north by Bako Gazer and Male, on the northeast by the Dirashe special woreda, on the east by the Konso special woreda, and on the southeast by the Oromia Region; the Weito River separates it from Konso special woreda and Oromia Region. Western part of this woreda is included in the Mago National Park. The administrative center is Key Afer. Bena Tsemay was part of former Hamer Bena woreda.

Demographics 
Based on the 2007 Census conducted by the CSA, this woreda has a total population of 52,968, of whom 26,778 are men and 26,190 women; 2,154 or 4.07% of its population are urban dwellers. The majority of the inhabitants practiced traditional beliefs, with 74.5% of the population reporting that belief, 10.87% were Protestants, and 7.74% practiced Ethiopian Orthodox Christianity.

Notes 

Districts of the Southern Nations, Nationalities, and Peoples' Region